Zlatko Dračić (born 17 November 1940) is a Croatian retired football player. From 1983 to 1986, he was vice-president of NK Zagreb and from 1989 to 1999 club director.

Club career
He is best known for playing as a prolific forward at NK Zagreb between 1957 and 1968, with whom he became top scorer in the 1964–65 Yugoslav First League, with 23 goals in 26 league appearances.

After leaving NK Zagreb in the late 1960s, he had short stints playing for Independiente in Argentina, Zwolle in the Netherlands, and KSV Sottegem in Belgium.

International career
He was also capped once for Yugoslavia, in a September 1965 friendly against the Soviet Union played in Moscow, coming on as a substitute for Milan Galić.

References

External sources
 
 Profile at Nogometni Leksikon 
 

1940 births
Living people
People from Kutina
Association football forwards
Yugoslav footballers
Yugoslavia international footballers
NK Zagreb players
Club Atlético Independiente footballers
PEC Zwolle players
Yugoslav First League players
Yugoslav Second League players
Challenger Pro League players
Yugoslav expatriate footballers
Expatriate footballers in Argentina
Yugoslav expatriate sportspeople in Argentina
Expatriate footballers in the Netherlands
Yugoslav expatriate sportspeople in the Netherlands
Expatriate footballers in Belgium
Yugoslav expatriate sportspeople in Belgium